Atmakur is a town in the Nandyal district of Andhra Pradesh, India.

Geography 
Atmakur is a Municipality and Revenue Division HQ, located 67 km from Kurnool district in Andhra Pradesh. It serves as a major transit point connecting important cities including Kurnool and Guntur. The route to Srisailam from Kurnool and Nandyal also traverses through Atmakur. The geography says that Atmakur is surrounded by Nallamalla Forest. Srisailam Right Main  Canal which provides irrigation water to Kurnool, Anantapur, Kadapa and Chittoor districts and Chennai City starts near Atmakur only. Sangamaheshwaram the place where seven rivers meet is located around 30 km from Atmakur. The population of Atmakur according to 2011 Census is 45,703.

Governance 
Atmakur is a Municipality of Grade - 2 Category.  According to 2011 Census, the town has population of 45,703.

Transport 
The Andhra Pradesh State Road Transport Corporation operates bus services from Atmakur-K bus station.

Distance to Major towns and cities 

 Kurnool = 67 km
 Nandyal = 51 km
 Adoni = 170 km
 Nandikotkur = 39 km
 Guntur = 230 km
 Kadapa = 180 km
 Tirupati = 320 km
 Hyderabad = 280 km
 Bengaluru = 420 km
 Vijayawada = 285 km

Entertainment

Movies 

 Ranga Mahal 70 mm
 Lakshmi Ranga
 Veera Bhadra [Dormant]
 Sai Baba [Demolished].

References

Cities and towns in Nandyal district